WW Aurigae is an eclipsing binary star system in the northern constellation of Auriga. It has a combined maximum apparent visual magnitude of 5.86, which is bright enough to be dimly visible to the naked eye. The system is moving further away with a heliocentric radial velocity of −9 km/s, having come to within  some 3.12 million years ago.

This is a double-lined spectroscopic binary system, having a circular orbit with a period of 2.5 days. It was discovered to be variable independently by Friedrich Schwab and Heinrich Van Solowiew in 1913. Both components are metallic-lined, or Am stars, with a spectrum showing a deficiency of calcium and scandium, and an overabundance of heavier elements. Together they form an EA, or Algol-type, eclipsing binary with the primary occultation reducing the net magnitude to a minimum of 6.54 and the secondary eclipse lowering it to 6.43, over a cycle time of 2.52501936 days.

References

External links
 HR 2372
 Image WW Aurigae

Am stars
Eclipsing binaries
Algol variables
Spectroscopic binaries
Auriga (constellation)
Durchmusterung objects
046052
031173
2372
Aurigae, WW